Gibraltar Rock is a granite outcrop in the Porongurup National Park, south of Perth, in Western Australia. Since the 1970s, the Rock, along with some other local peaks, has become a popular venue for rock climbers.

Location
The rock is located in the Porongorups Range, which has thirteen total named peaks including Twin Peaks, The Devils Slide, Nancy Peak, Castle Rock, and Elephant Rock. From the peak of the rock, Albany and the Great Southern Ocean can be seen. Road access to the rock is from Bolganup Road and Scenic Drive.

Features
The rock is made of rough granite. Its appearance has been compared to the Rock of Gibraltar.

In the early 1990s, the Rock was yielding small amounts of gold to the "dollying" process. It shares characteristics with other terrain in the area which was successfully mined in the late 1800s. The lack of water in the area made more successful mining of the rock difficult in the early part of the twentieth century.

Gibraltar Rock has been described as "an enormous hunk of rough granite that provides the longest and most serious slab climbing in WA". The first organised climb by the Climbers Association of Western Australia was done in 1974. One of the faces of the rock is called Dockyard Wall. It was originally graded 17 crux climb. Two climbing bolts were added to this route in 1992. Other routes up the mountain include Second Anniversary Waltz, Crime of Passion, Dinosaur, Apes Den, Illusions of Grandeur, Possum, Apesway, Main Street, Sucked in Ben, Moorish Steps, Europa Point, Rooster Carnage, Joint Venture, and Zeppelin.

Background
In 1928, an exhibition of the watercolor works of  Bardwell Clarke was held at the artist's studio, Sheffield House, Perth. The exhibition included a work featuring Gibraltar Rock. A winery is named after the rock.

See also

Granite outcrops of Western Australia

References
Citations

Sources

Great Southern (Western Australia)
Rock formations of Western Australia